A national second tier of Norwegian league football was established in 1963. The league took over for Landsdelsserien, a league consisting of seven regional groups, as the second tier in the Norwegian football league system. The league was named 2. divisjon. After the rebranding of the top tier ahead of the 1990 season, the second tier was rebranded as 1. divisjon in 1991.

Regional

1. divisjon (1948–1951)
Group winners competed in qualification play-offs for four spots in the following season's top division. 
Promoted teams are shown in bold.
 Teams marked with an asterisk (*) were not promoted

Landsdelsserien (1951–1962)
Winners from districts east/south and east/north were promoted to the top division. The remaining five winner qualified for promotion play-offs to compete for two spots in the following season's top division. In the 1961–62 season, only two teams promoted. 
Promoted teams are shown in bold.
 Teams marked with an asterisk (*) were not promoted

National

2. divisjon (1963–1990)
 Teams in bold were promoted
 Teams marked with an asterisk (*) were not promoted
 Teams in italics were teams from Northern Norway not eligible for promotion at the time.

1. divisjon (1991–)
 Teams in bold was promoted
 Team marked with an asterisk (*) was not promoted

Number of titles
This lists national league winners only. Clubs in bold are competing in 1. divisjon as of the current season.

Overall
The winners of Landsdelsserien (1951–1962) and the district groups (1970–1976) are not included.

6 wins: HamKam, Lyn, Sogndal
5 wins: Brann, Mjøndalen
4 wins: Start, Vålerenga
3 wins: Odd, Hødd, Strømsgodset, Skeid, Molde, Moss, Bodø/Glimt, Haugesund, Viking, Tromsø
2 wins: Rosenborg, Frigg, Fredrikstad, Strømmen, Fyllingen
1 win: Sandefjord BK, Raufoss, Steinkjer, Lisleby, Pors, Sarpsborg FK, Os, Lillestrøm, Bryne, Mo, Kongsvinger, Mjølner, Strindheim, Stabæk, Hønefoss, Sandefjord, Kristiansund, Aalesund

In the current one-conference system (1997–)
2 wins: Vålerenga, Odd, Haugesund, Start, Sogndal, Bodø/Glimt, Tromsø
1 win: Lyn, HamKam, Stabæk, Strømsgodset, Molde, Hønefoss, Sandefjord, Kristiansund, Viking, Aalesund

Footnotes

References

Norwegian First Division